WinPlay3 was the first real-time MP3 audio player for PCs running Windows, both 16-bit (Windows 3.1) and 32-bit (Windows 95). Prior to this, audio compressed with MP3 had to be decompressed prior to listening. It was released by Fraunhofer IIS ("Institute for Integrated Circuits"), creators of the MP3 format, on September 9, 1995. The latest version was released on May 23, 1997. Since then, the Fraunhofer Society has removed any trace and mention of WinPlay3 from their web sites.  However, the software remains available by utilizing the Web Archive, or one of the links below.

The program became popular thanks to the warez scene. The first warez group to bring WinPlay3 to attention of a wider audience was Compress Da Audio. They released MP3 rips of CDs, with copies of WinPlay3 included, on several FTP-based warez sites. Rabid Neurosis emerged shortly afterwards, after which the scene exploded.

Until the release of Winamp in 1997, WinPlay3 was the sole option for playing MP3-compressed music on Microsoft Windows. Unlike modern audio programs, such as Winamp or iTunes, it lacked advanced features such as equalizers, or playlists as a menu option, and concentrated mostly on playback. A playlist can be created by hand, however, in a simple text file listing the system path to each MP3 and saving the file with an M3U extension. The m3u playlist support made it the first widely available media player application that offered a well-integrated streaming experience for the web user. Clicking a link on a webpage launched WinPlay3, which would start a stream of the mp3 listed in the m3u file. The limitations were most likely due to the requirement of a 486DX processor running at 66 MHz for real-time playback, which at the time was fairly high.

References

External links 
 FhG IIS WinPlay3 on Really Rare Wares (September 1995 through May 1997) (16- and 32-bit versions)

Windows-only shareware
Windows media players